Desognaphosa is a genus of spiders in the family Trachycosmidae. It was first described in 2002 by Platnick. , it contains 26 species, most found in Queensland.  D. solomani is found in the Solomon Islands; D. yabbra is found in Queensland and New South Wales.

Species
Desognaphosa comprises the following 26 species:
Desognaphosa bartle Platnick, 2002
Desognaphosa bellenden Platnick, 2002
Desognaphosa boolbun Platnick, 2002
Desognaphosa bulburin Platnick, 2002
Desognaphosa carbine Platnick, 2002
Desognaphosa dryander Platnick, 2002
Desognaphosa eungella Platnick, 2002
Desognaphosa finnigan Platnick, 2002
Desognaphosa funnel Platnick, 2002
Desognaphosa goonaneman Platnick, 2002
Desognaphosa halcyon Platnick, 2002
Desognaphosa homerule Platnick, 2002
Desognaphosa karnak Platnick, 2002
Desognaphosa kirrama Platnick, 2002
Desognaphosa kroombit Platnick, 2002
Desognaphosa kuranda Platnick, 2002
Desognaphosa malbon Platnick, 2002
Desognaphosa massey Platnick, 2002
Desognaphosa millaa Platnick, 2002
Desognaphosa pershouse Platnick, 2002
Desognaphosa solomoni Platnick, 2002
Desognaphosa spurgeon Platnick, 2002
Desognaphosa tribulation Platnick, 2002
Desognaphosa tyson Platnick, 2002
Desognaphosa windsor Platnick, 2002
Desognaphosa yabbra Platnick, 2002

References

Trochanteriidae
Araneomorphae genera
Spiders of Australia
Spiders of Oceania